Fredrik Bergh (born 22 April 1975) is a former professional tennis player from Sweden.

Bergh, a doubles specialist, appeared in five Grand Slam tournaments. He partnered Peter Nyborg in four of them and the pair never failed to make it past the first round. At the 2000 French Open he made the third round of the mixed doubles, with Meghann Shaughnessy.

He had his best year in 1998, reaching the final of two events on the ATP Tour, in Prague and Split. Also that year, Bergh and partner Sander Groen had a win over the world's top ranked doubles pairing of Jacco Eltingh and Paul Haarhuis, in Halle.

ATP career finals

Doubles: 2 (0–2)

References

1975 births
Living people
Swedish male tennis players
People from Karlskoga Municipality
Sportspeople from Örebro County
20th-century Swedish people